John de Derby was the inaugural Dean of Lichfield, serving from 1222 until 1254.

References

Deans of Lichfield
Year of birth missing
Year of death missing